Qosqophryne flammiventris is a species of frog in the family Strabomantidae.
It is only found in Vilcabamba, Cusco, Peru, at 3,000 meters above sea level.
Its natural habitat is high altitude montane grasslands, where it lives in thick layers of moss. It was originally classified as a member of Bryophryne, but was later moved to the newly created genus Qosqophryne.

References

Endemic fauna of Peru
Strabomantidae
Amphibians of Peru
Amphibians described in 2010